Skara is a genus of maxillopod crustacean known from the Upper Cambrian Orsten deposit of Sweden and similarly aged deposits in China. It is the only genus in the order Skaracarida and family Skaraidae, and contains three species:
Skara anulata Müller, 1983
Skara minuta Müller & Walossek, 1985
Skara huanensis Liu & Dong, 2007

The feeding system of Skara resembles those of copepods and Derocheilocaris, and the three taxa are accordingly grouped together as the clade Copepodoida. Skara is likely to have scraped or brushed the substrate to release food.

References

Maxillopoda
Prehistoric crustaceans
Crustacean orders

Cambrian genus extinctions